Peter Griffiths (born 13 March 1980) is an English former professional footballer who played on the wing in the Football League for Macclesfield Town. He also played non-league football for clubs including Ashton United and Winsford United.

References

External links
 

1980 births
Living people
Footballers from St Helens, Merseyside
English footballers
Association football wingers
Ashton United F.C. players
Macclesfield Town F.C. players
Winsford United F.C. players
Northern Premier League players
English Football League players